Peter Marshall (May 27, 1902 – January 26, 1949) was a Scottish-American preacher, pastor of the New York Avenue Presbyterian Church in Washington, D.C., and was appointed as Chaplain of the United States Senate.

He is remembered popularly from the success of A Man Called Peter (1951), a biography written by his widow, Catherine Marshall, and the book's 1955 film adaptation, which was nominated for an Academy Award for its cinematography.

Early life and education

Born in Coatbridge, North Lanarkshire, Scotland, a poverty-stricken coal-mining community, where he was reared by his mother and stepfather. 

From an early age, he  decided he would be a missionary to China. To meet the educational requirements, he enrolled in evening classes while working in the mines by day, but his progress was slow. In 1927, a cousin offered to pay Peter's way to the U.S., where he could receive proper ministerial training. He graduated from Columbia Theological Seminary in 1931.

Ministry
 
He was called as the pastor of the First Presbyterian Church, a small, rural church in Covington, Georgia. After a brief pastorate, Marshall accepted a call to Atlanta's Westminster Presbyterian Church in 1933.

Marriage and family
In Atlanta, Marshall met his future wife, Catherine Wood, then a student at Agnes Scott College.  They married on November 4, 1936, and had one son, Peter John Marshall (January 21, 1940 – September 8, 2010), who  followed his father into the Presbyterian clergy and ran a national ministry, Peter Marshall Ministries, from Orleans, Massachusetts. He wrote many books on the Christian faith in the United States.

Later career
In 1937, Marshall became pastor of the New York Avenue Presbyterian Church in Washington, D.C. In 1946 he was appointed as US Senate Chaplain, serving from January 4, 1947, until his sudden death of a heart attack just over two years later, at age 46.

Marshall is buried at Fort Lincoln Cemetery (Section C, Lot 344, Site 1) in Brentwood, Maryland.

Later years
Catherine Marshall developed a career as a writer, publishing more than 220 books. These included many editions of her late husband's sermons, several of her own inspirational books, and the best-selling novel Christy, inspired by her mother's accounts of her early teaching years in Appalachia.

In 1959, Catherine Marshall married Leonard LeSourd, executive editor of Guideposts magazine. 

She died on March 18, 1983, at a hospital in Boynton Beach, Florida, after suffering a heart attack. She was buried at her request next to her first husband, Peter Marshall.

Legacy
Dr. Peter Marshall School (Anaheim, California).
Catherine Marshall wrote a biography of her husband, A Man Called Peter (1951), which was a popular success.
It was adapted as a a film of the same title, released in 1955, which was nominated for the Oscar for Best Cinematography. Directed by Henry Koster, it featured Richard Todd as Peter Marshall, and Jean Peters as Catherine Marshall. Todd studied tape recordings of several Marshall sermons from 1947 to 1948; some of these historic recordings were later released to the public by Caedmon Records.
The biography was also adapted as a stage play by the same name, produced in 1955.

Archival collections
The Presbyterian Historical Society in Philadelphia, Pennsylvania, has an undated carbon copy transcript of Catherine Marshall’s biography, A Man Called Peter. The undated transcript includes penciled annotations. The Society also holds a collection of Marshall’s sermons from his years as a pastor at Westminster Presbyterian Church and New York Avenue Presbyterian Church.
The McCain Library at Agnes Scott College in Decatur, Georgia holds a large collection of papers donated by the estate of Catherine Marshall. Some of these papers included correspondence from Peter Marshall, photographs and recordings of him. Catherine Marshall donated a number of audio recordings of Peter Marshall's sermons to the U.S. Library of Congress.

References

External links
 .
 , 1955 film based on the book, on the Internet Movie Database
  (founded by the son of Peter Marshall, also called Peter Marshall).
 .

Chaplains of the United States Senate
1902 births
1949 deaths
American evangelicals
American Presbyterian ministers
People from Coatbridge
Scottish emigrants to the United States
People from Covington, Georgia
20th-century American clergy